This is a list of media outlets in Prince George, British Columbia, Canada.

Radio

Television
The city is served by CKPG-TV, a conventional broadcast station which originates programming locally.  All of the city's other television signals are rebroadcasters of stations from Vancouver, British Columbia.

As in most Canadian cities, digital television transmission has not commenced in Prince George as of early 2014. However, all of the city's television signals have their DTV channel assignments already in place.

Shaw Communications operates a community channel, Shaw TV, in Prince George. Shaw also carries Vancouver CBC Television station CBUT-DT to all subscribers, following CKPG-TV's disaffiliation from the CBC network, which left the community with no local CBC Television transmitter, as well as Radio-Canada station CBUFT-DT, whose repeater closed down on July 31, 2012. The Prince George area does not receive CBC Television, Ici Radio-Canada Télé, or CTV over the air.

Publications
Prince George has one main newspaper, a daily, the Prince George Citizen, winner of the 2006 Michener Award, which appears Tuesday through Saturday. The Prince George Free Press which appeared on Wednesday and Friday, ceased publication on May 1, 2015. Over the Edge publishes student-based content out of the University of Northern British Columbia every other week from September to March, and offers online content throughout the rest of the year. There are also two café newsletters, PG Xpress (weekly) and Walk-N-Roll Publications (every two weeks).  Prince George also has two advertising publications, the Prince George Buy & Sell and the Prince George Bargain Finder. The two major national newspapers, the National Post and The Globe and Mail, as well as The Province and the Vancouver Sun, are widely available.

One news source, Opinion 250, is published exclusively on-line, with updates several times per day.

References

Prince George

Media, Prince George